Ocotlán District is located in the south of the Valles Centrales Region of the State of Oaxaca, Mexico.

Municipalities

The district includes the following municipalities:

 Asunción Ocotlán
 Magdalena Ocotlán
 Ocotlán de Morelos
 San Antonino Castillo Velasco
 San Baltazar Chichicapam
 San Dionisio Ocotlán
 San Jerónimo Taviche
 San José del Progreso
 San Juan Chilateca
 San Martín Tilcajete
 San Miguel Tilquiapam
 San Pedro Apóstol
 San Pedro Mártir
 San Pedro Taviche
 Santa Ana Zegache
 Santa Catarina Minas
 Santa Lucía Ocotlán
 Santiago Apóstol
 Santo Tomás Jalieza
 Yaxe Magdalena

References

Districts of Oaxaca
Valles Centrales de Oaxaca